The Marriage Chance is a 1922 American silent comedy film directed by Hampton Del Ruth and starring Alta Allen, Milton Sills and Irene Rich.

Cast
 Alta Allen as 	Eleannor Douglas
 Milton Sills as 	William Bradley
 Henry B. Walthall as 	Dr. Paul Graydon
 Tully Marshall as Timothy Lamb
 Irene Rich as 	Mary Douglas
 Mitchell Lewis as The Mute
 Laura La Varnie as 	Martha Douglas
 Nick Cogley as 	Uncle Remus

References

Bibliography
 Connelly, Robert B. The Silents: Silent Feature Films, 1910-36, Volume 40, Issue 2. December Press, 1998.
 Munden, Kenneth White. The American Film Institute Catalog of Motion Pictures Produced in the United States, Part 1. University of California Press, 1997.

External links
 

1922 films
1922 comedy films
1920s English-language films
American silent feature films
Silent American comedy films
American black-and-white films
Films directed by Hampton Del Ruth
1920s American films